Faraweyne is a town in the Maroodijeex region of Somaliland close to the border with Ethiopia. It is also close to the town of Allaybaday on the border.

See also
Administrative divisions of Somaliland
Regions of Somaliland
Districts of Somaliland

References
Faraweyne

Populated places in Maroodi Jeex